A Long Time Coming (A Change Is Gonna Come)  is the eighth studio album by American R&B singer Evelyn "Champagne" King, released on October 28, 1985 by RCA Records. It was produced by Theodore Life, Hawk, René & Angela, Bobby Watson, Allen George, and Fred McFarlane.

History
The album peaked at No. 38 on the R&B albums chart. It produced the hit singles "Your Personal Touch", "High Horse", and "Slow Down". The album was digitally remastered and reissued on CD with bonus tracks in 2008 by Bluebird Records and again in 2014 by Funky Town Grooves Records. The latter was issued on two CDs, adding the non-LP track "Take a Chance" (the B-side of both the 7" and 12" versions of "High Horse") and "Give It Up" from the soundtrack of the film Fright Night, which was also released as a single in 1985.

Track listing

Charts

References

External links
 

Evelyn "Champagne" King albums
1985 albums
RCA Records albums